Amalie Magelund Krogh (born 13 May 2000) is a Danish badminton player, specializing in doubles play. As a junior player, she was a silver medalist at the 2018 European Junior Championships in both the team and girls' doubles events.

Achievements

European Championships 
Women's doubles

European Junior Championships 
Girls' doubles

BWF World Tour (4 runners-up) 
The BWF World Tour, which was announced on 19 March 2017 and implemented in 2018, is a series of elite badminton tournaments sanctioned by the Badminton World Federation (BWF). The BWF World Tour is divided into levels of World Tour Finals, Super 1000, Super 750, Super 500, Super 300 (part of the HSBC World Tour), and the BWF Tour Super 100.

Women's doubles

Mixed doubles

BWF International Challenge/Series (8 titles, 4 runners-up) 
Women's doubles

Mixed doubles

  BWF International Challenge tournament
  BWF International Series tournament
  BWF Future Series tournament

References

External links 
 

2000 births
Living people
People from Roskilde
Danish female badminton players
Sportspeople from Region Zealand
21st-century Danish women